SVP Worldwide is an American private company that designs, manufactures, and distributes consumer sewing machines and accessories around the world under three brands: Singer, Husqvarna Viking, and Pfaff.

The company's corporate headquarters is located in Nashville, TN and is supplemented by regional headquarters and sales offices located in Milan (Italy), São Paulo (Brazil), and Sydney (Australia).

Via its affiliates, SVP operates in more than 180 countries.

The company has its central R&D, sales, and customer service employees in the Huskvarna/Jönköping region of Sweden with support teams in Shanghai, London and Nashville.

History
SVP was formed when Kohlberg & Company, an American private equity firm that owned the Swedish VSM Group (owner of the Husqvarna Viking and Pfaff sewing machine brands), combined VSM with Singer, which it acquired in 2004 for $134 million. The company was founded in 2006 and was formerly headquartered in Hamilton, Bermuda.

In 2018, Kohlberg & Company sold SVP Worldwide to Ares Management, a publicly traded global asset manager based in Los Angeles.

In 2020, SVP's subsidiary Singer reported an increase in machine sales due to the COVID-19 pandemic. In response, the company released a variety of patterns for DIY reusable face masks. Also in 2020, SVP collaborated with the Amazon Prime show Making the Cut.

In 2021, SVP unveiled an upcoming sewing machine, the Pfaff Creative Icon 2, which will operate with artificial intelligence functions. Also in 2021, SVP was acquired by Platinum Equity.

See also
 List of sewing machine brands

References

External links 
SVP Worldwide

American companies established in 2004
Manufacturing companies established in 2004
Privately held companies based in Tennessee
Sewing machine brands
Home appliance manufacturers of the United States
Manufacturing companies based in Nashville, Tennessee
Kohlberg Kravis Roberts companies
2018 mergers and acquisitions
2021 mergers and acquisitions
Private equity portfolio companies